The UK Rock & Metal Albums Chart is a record chart which ranks the best-selling rock and heavy metal albums in the United Kingdom. Compiled and published by the Official Charts Company, the data is based on each album's weekly physical sales, digital downloads and streams. In 2007, there were 21 albums that topped the 52 published charts. The first number-one album of the year was Muse's fourth studio album Black Holes and Revelations, released the previous year, which spent the first three weeks of the year at number one. The first new number-one of the year was Chimaira's fourth studio album Resurrection, in March. The final number-one album of the year was the Led Zeppelin's compilation album Mothership, which spent the last six weeks of 2007 and the first week of 2008 at the top of the chart.

The most successful album on the UK Rock & Metal Albums Chart in 2007 was My Chemical Romance's third studio album The Black Parade, which spent a total of seven weeks at number one over three separate spells. Echoes, Silence, Patience & Grace, the sixth studio album by Foo Fighters, spent six weeks at number one and was the best-selling rock and metal album of the year, ranking 15th in the UK End of Year Albums Chart. Led Zeppelin's Mothership also spent six weeks at number one during the year, while Linkin Park's Minutes to Midnight spent five and Muse's Black Holes and Revelations spent four. Paramore's Riot! was number one for three weeks in 2007, while six more albums – Stadium Arcadium, Take to the Skies, Year Zero, Snakes & Arrows, Lost Highway and Libertad – each spent two weeks at number one.

Chart history

See also
2007 in British music
List of UK Rock & Metal Singles Chart number ones of 2007

References

External links
Official UK Rock & Metal Albums Chart Top 40 at the Official Charts Company
The Official UK Top 40 Rock Albums at BBC Radio 1

2007 in British music
United Kingdom Rock and Metal Albums
2007